The following is a list of notable deaths in January 2002.

Entries for each day are listed alphabetically by surname. A typical entry lists information in the following sequence:
 Name, age, country of citizenship at birth, subsequent country of citizenship (if applicable), reason for notability, cause of death (if known), and reference.

January 2002

1
Mohand Arav Bessaoud, 77, Algerian writer and activist.
Daulat Bikram Bista, 76, Nepali writer and poet.
Patrick Kwame Kusi Quaidoo, 77, Ghanaian politician and businessman.
Bonnie Mealing, 89, Australian swimmer (silver medal in women's 100 metre backstroke at the 1932 Summer Olympics).
Carol Ohmart, 74, American actress (House on Haunted Hill, The Wild Party, The Scarlet Hour) and model.
Julia Phillips, 57, American film producer (The Sting, Taxi Driver, Close Encounters of the Third Kind) and author, Oscar winner (1974), cancer.
Nuchhungi Renthlei, 88, Indian poet and singer.
Astrid Sampe, 92, Swedish textile designer.
Catya Sassoon, 33, American actress, singer and model, heart attack after drug overdose.
Meg Wyllie, 84, American actress (The Twilight Zone, Perry Mason, Star Trek, The Fugitive).

2
Armi Aavikko, 43, Finnish beauty queen and singer.
Ahmed Dawood, 102, Pakistani industrialist and philanthropist.
Cindy Garner, 75, American actress and model.
Ian Grist, 63, British Conservative politician, stroke.
Geetha Hiranyan, 43, Indian writer of Malayalam literature.
Michael Howe, 61, British psychologist.
Charlie Mitten, 80, English football player and manager.
Chester Nimitz Jr., 86, American submarine commander.
Bibi Osterwald, 81, American actress.
Jonathan Rhoads, 94, American surgeon and inventor of parenteral nutrition.

3
Ruby F. Bryant, 95, American ninth chief of the United States Army Nurse Corps.
Satish Dhawan, 81, Indian aerospace engineer.
Miki Dora, 67, American surfing legend ("King of Malibu"), stunt double and actor (Beach Blanket Bingo, How to Stuff a Wild Bikini).
Juan García Esquivel, 83, Mexican bandleader and composer for film and television.
Zac Foley, 31, bass guitarist for EMF.
Freddy Heineken, 78, Dutch beer magnate.
John Gabriel Parkes, 84, British businessman.
Martin Ruby, 79, American gridiron football player.
Al Smith, 73, American baseball player (Cleveland Indians, Chicago White Sox, Baltimore Orioles, Boston Red Sox).

4
Nathan Chapman, 31, U.S. Army soldier, first American soldier killed in combat in the war in Afghanistan.
Helen Crabtree, 86, American equitation coach.
Georg Ericson, 82, Swedish football (soccer) player and coach.
Michael Howard, 79, English choral conductor, organist and composer.
Douglas Jung, 74, Canadian politician and a member of Parliament (House of Commons representing Vancouver Centre, British Columbia).
Adrián Zabala, 85, Cuban-born baseball player (New York Giants).

5
Igor Cassini, 86, American syndicated gossip columnist (Cholly Knickerbocker) for the Hearst newspaper.
Valentin Chernikov, 64, Soviet Olympic fencer (1956 men's team épée, bronze medal at 1960 men's team épée).
Fielding Dawson, 71, American author, poet and artist.
Christie Harris, 94, Canadian children's writer.
Astrid Henning-Jensen, 87, Danish film director, actress, and screenwriter.
Kamel Maghur, 67, Libyan lawyer and diplomat.
Raza Naqvi Wahi, 87, Indian poet.

6
Bobby Austin, 68, American country musician ("Apartment No. 9", "For Your Love").
Per-Arne Berglund, 74, Swedish Olympic javelin thrower (1948 men's javelin throw, 1952 men's javelin throw).
Chuang Ming-yao, 64, Taiwanese admiral, diplomat and politician.
Sanya Dharmasakti, 94, Thai jurist, university professor and politician, Prime Minister of Thailand from 1973 to 1975.
Burton Edelson, 75, American NASA space science administrator and a leader in satellite communications.
Heinz Heuer, 83, German Nazi military police officer.
Johnnie Mae Matthews, 79, American blues and R&B singer, songwriter, and record producer, cancer.
Mario Nascimbene, 88, Italian film soundtrack composer.
John W. Reynolds, Jr., 80, American politician and jurist, Governor of Wisconsin (1963–1965).
Fred Taylor, 77, American basketball coach (Ohio State University) and baseball player (Washington Senators).
Marian Wenzel, 69, British artist and art historian, leading authority on the art of medieval Bosnia and Herzegovina, cancer.
Christa Worthington, 45, American fashion writer (Women's Wear Daily, Cosmopolitan, ELLE, Harper's Bazaar), homicide.

7
Frank Cave, 59, British trade unionist and political activist (National Union of Mineworkers).
Geoff Crompton, 46, American professional basketball player (Denver Nuggets, Portland Trail Blazers, Milwaukee Bucks, San Antonio Spurs, Cleveland Cavaliers), leukemia.
Geoffrey Crossley, 80, British Formula One race car driver, stroke.
Robert J. Lamphere, 83, American agent of th Federal Bureau of Investigation (FBI), combination of Parkinson's disease and prostate cancer.
Jon Lee, 33, British drummer (Feeder).
Hal Marnie, 83, American baseball player (Philadelphia Phillies).
Mighty Igor, 70, American professional wrestler, heart attack.
Avery Schreiber, 66, American comedian and actor, known as Doritos advertisement funnyman, heart attack.
Gene Strandness, 73, American physician, university professor and research scientist, known as a pioneer in the field of vascular ultrasound.

8
M. S. Bartlett, 91, English statistician, considered one of the great names of the twentieth century in probability and statistics.
Charles "Nish" Bruce, 45, British soldier, parachutist and author (Freefall).
Stanko Despot, 73, Yugoslavian (Croatian) Olympic rower (men's eight rowing at the 1952 Summer Olympics).
Shafi Edu, 91, Nigerian businessman and conservationist.
David McWilliams, 56, Northern Irish singer-songwriter ("Days of Pearly Spencer").
Kitanonada Noboru, 78, Japanses sumo wrestler.
Alexander Prokhorov, 85, Soviet physicist, winner of 1964 Nobel Prize in Physics.
Dave Thomas, 69, American entrepreneur, founder of Wendy's.
Glayde Whitney, 62, American behavioral geneticist and psychologist, promoted controversial race based genetics.

9
Benjamín Casado, 73, Puerto Rican Olympic high jumper (men's high jump at the 1948 Summer Olympics).
Alan Christie, 96, Canadian Olympic sprinter (men's 400 metres, men's 4 × 400 metres relay at the 1924 Summer Olympics).
Peter Levathes, 90, American  film and advertising executive.
Mush March, 93, Canadian professional ice hockey player (Chicago Black Hawks).
Bill McCutcheon, 77, American actor (Sesame Street, Anything Goes, Steel Magnolias), Tony winner (1988).
Wang Ruoshui, 75, Chinese journalist, political theorists and philosopher, lung cancer.
K. William Stinson, 71, U.S. Representative from Washington.
Fred Tappert, 61, American physicist.

10
Andrew Boyd, 91, American Olympic fencer (1936 men's team  épée, 1948 men's team  épée).
John Buscema, 74, American comic book artist (Marvel Comics), best known for The Avengers, Conan the Barbarian, Fantastic Four, Silver Surfer, Tarzan, Thor.
W. A. Criswell, 92, American pastor, author and two-term president of the Southern Baptist Convention from 1968 to 1970.
Philip Drazin, 67, British mathematician, university teacher and author, an international expert in fluid dynamics.
Moe Foner, 86, American labor leader, founded Bread and Roses, an influential cultural arts program.
Ikko Tanaka, 71, Japanese graphic designer, heart attack.
Cedric Smith, 84, British statistician.

11
Peggy Antonio, 83, Australian cricketer.
Gerrit Brokx, 68, Dutch politician.
Julian Faber, 84, English business executive.
Christer Strömholm, 83, Swedish photographer.
Henri Verneuil, 81, French filmmaker and playwright.
C. R. Vyas, 77, Indian classical singer.

12
Bernard Bennett, 70, English snooker and billiards player.
John Berger, 92, Swedish Olympic cross-country skier (bronze medal winner in the men's 4 × 10 kilometre relay at the 1936 Winter Olympics).
Moss Evans, 76, British union leader, general secretary of the Transport and General Workers Union.
Edwin M. Martin, 93, American diplomat and ambassador, pneumonia.
Harold B. McSween, 75, American politician (U.S. Representative for Louisiana's 8th congressional district) and businessman.
Ernest Pintoff, 70, American film and television director and animator (Academy Award for Best Animated Short Film for The Critic).
Anne Poor, 84, American artist and United States Army art correspondent.
Henry S. Reuss, 89, American politician.
Robert Francis Ruttledge, 102, Irish ornithologist.
Stanley Unwin, 90, South African-born English comedian.
Cyrus Vance, 84, United States Secretary of State, international peacemaker.
Dominica Verges, 83, Cuban singer.

13
Rodney Bobiwash, Anishinaabe First Nations activist and scholar.
Richard Bolt, 90, American physicist, specializing in acoustics, founded Bolt, Beranek and Newman.
Christian von Bülow, 84, Danish Olympic sailor (silver medal in 1956 Dragon sailing, gold medal in 1964 Dragon sailing).
Ted Demme, 38, American  film and television director (Blow, The Ref, Yo! MTV Raps, Beautiful Girls), heart attack.
Samuel Dolin, 84, Canadian composer and music educator, founding member of the Canadian League of Composers in 1951.
Guadalupe Dueñas, Mexican short story writer and essayist.
Edward Ellis, 83, British naval officer.
Paul Fannin, 94, American politician and businessman, Governor of Arizona (1959–1965), U.S. Senator from Arizona (1965–1977).
Gregorio Fuentes, 104, Cuban sailor and Ernest Hemingway's first mate, fishing companion and confidant.
Antonije Isaković, 78, Serbian writer.
Ferdinand Weiss, 69, Romanian pianist.

14
Ebenezer Ako-Adjei, 85, Ghanese politician.
Edith Bouvier Beale, 84, American socialite, fashion model and cabaret performer, known as "Little Edie".
Harold Campbell, 88, British activist, developed the housing cooperative movement.
Sir Nicolas Cheetham, 91, British diplomat.
David Hamer, 78, Australian politician.
Antonio Sbardella, 76, Italian football player, referee and sports official.
Olav Selvaag, 89, Norwegian engineer and residential contractor.
Michael Young, Baron Young of Dartington, 86, British sociologist, social activist and politician, coined the term "meritocracy".

15
Michael Anthony Bilandic, 78, American politician (39th Mayor of Chicago), heart failure.
Jean Dockx, 60, Belgian football player and manager.
Jeremy Hawk, 83, British actor (Elizabeth).
Francis D. Hole, 88, American pedologist and musician.
David McEnery, 87, American artist and musician.
Vithabai Bhau Mang Narayangaonkar, Indian artist.
Kevin O'Donnell, 77, Australian rules footballer.
Michel Poniatowski, 79, French politician.

16
Robert Hanbury Brown, 85, British astronomer and astrophysicist, pioneered the development of radar and radio astronomy.
Henry E. Erwin, 80, American U.S. Army Air Forces airman and recipient of the Medal of Honor for his actions in World War II.
Ivan Foxwell, 87, British film producer and screenwriter (Colditz Story, A Touch of Larceny, The Quiller Memorandum).
Harding Lawrence, 81, American airline chief executive.
Bobo Olson, 73, American boxer.
Ron Taylor, 49, American actor (The Wiz, The Simpsons, Rover Dangerfield), heart attack.
Michael Walford, 86, British field hockey, rugby and cricket player (silver medal in field hockey at the 1948 Summer Olympics).

17
Peter Adamson, 71, British actor (Coronation Street).
Diana Boddington, 80, British stage manager (Orson Welles, Laurence Olivier).
Camilo José Cela, 85, Spanish novelist, poet,  and essayist, 1989 Nobel Prize in Literature.
Queenie Leonard, 96, British character actress and singer.
Eddie Meduza, 53, Swedish rockabilly composer and musician, heart attack.
Harvey Matusow, 75,  American artist, communist and Federal Bureau of Investigation informer, car accident
Brian Simon, 86, British educationalist and historian.

18
Celso Daniel, 50, Brazilian politician and mayor, murdered.
Jovdat Hajiyev, 84, Azerbaijani composers of the Soviet period.
Alex Hannum, 78, American basketball coach.
Marilyn Harris, 70, American author.

19
Jeff Astle, 59, English footballer.
Jim Cameron, 71, Australian politician (Speaker of the New South Wales Legislative Assembly).
Roy Conrad, 61, American actor (Patch Adams, Casino, Titan A.E.).
Wade Hemsworth, 85, Canadian folk singer and songwriter.
Ricky Womack, 40, American professional boxer (1982 U.S. amateur heavyweight champion), suicide.

20
John Aveni, 66, American professional football player (Indiana University, Chicago Bears, Washington Redskins).
Walter C. Carter, 72, Canadian politician and a member of Parliament (House of Commons for St. John's West, Newfoundland and Labrador).
Carrie Hamilton, 38, American actress (Cool World, Fame).
John Jackson, 77, American blues musician.
R. N. Kao, 83, Indian spy and the first chief of India's intelligence agency.
Luule Viilma, 51, Estonian doctor, esotericist and practitioner of alternative medicine, car crash.
John Whitehead, 77, American college football coach and athletics administrator (Lehigh University).

21
Max Angst, 80, Swiss Olympic bobsledder (1956 Winter Olympics: two-man bobsleigh bronze medal, four-man bobsleigh).
Rolando Barral, 62, Cuban actor and talk show host (El Show de Rolando Barral), often called "the Latino Johnny Carson", stroke.
James D. Ewing, 85, American newspaper publisher and philanthropist.
Jorma Karhunen, 88, Finnish Air Force ace.
Peggy Lee, 81, American singer & actress (Lady and the Tramp, Pete Kelly's Blues, The Jazz Singer).
Marjorie Lewty, 95, British writer.
John Arthur Love, 85, American attorney and Republican politician (36th Governor of Colorado, first "Energy Czar").
Charlie Puckett, 90, Australian sportsman.
Makhan Singh, 64, Indian athlete.
Zenon Snylyk, 68, Ukrainian-American soccer player.
George Trapp, 53, American professional basketball player (Atlanta Hawks, Detroit Pistons), stabbed.
Edith Jones Woodward, 87, American astronomer and college professor.

22
Sheldon Allman, 77, Canadian-American singer, actor (Hud, In Cold Blood), songwriter and voice actor.
John D'Arms, 67, American historian and writer, brain cancer
Peter Bardens, 57, English keyboardist and a founding member of the British progressive rock group Camel.
Guido Bernardi, 80, Italian cyclist (silver medal in men's team pursuit cycling at the 1948 Summer Olympics).
Henry Cosby, 73, American songwriter ("My Cherie Amour", "The Tears of a Clown", "Uptight (Everything's Alright)").
George W. Dickerson, 88, American college football coach, interim head coach at UCLA for three games in 1958.
Lord Pretender, 84, Trinidad and Tobago musician, throat cancer.
Stanley Marcus, 96, American businessman.
Eric de Maré, 91, British architectural photographer and writer.
Salomon Tandeng Muna, 89, Cameroonian politician.
Jean Patchett, 75, American fashion model, known as a leading fashion model from the late 1940s through the early 1960s.
Jack Shea, 91, American speed skater (two-time men's speed skating gold medal: 500 metres and 1500 metres at the 1932 Winter Olympics).
A. H. Weiler, 93, American writer, editor and film critic for The New York Times.
John Andrew Young, 85, American politician (U.S. Representative for Texas's 14th congressional district).

23
Paul Aars, 67, American stock car driver.
Manuel Méndez Ballester, 92, Puerto Rican writer.
Louis T. Benezet, 86, American educator, small college advocate and president of multiple colleges.
Pierre Bourdieu, 71, French sociologist and philosopher (Distinction: A Social Critique of the Judgment of Taste).
Charlie Bradshaw, 65, American professional football player (Baylor, Los Angeles Rams, Pittsburgh Steelers, Detroit Lions).
Thomas Carey, 70, American operatic baritone.
Igor Kipnis, 71, American harpsichordist, pianist and conductor.
Robert Nozick, 63, American philosopher.
Benny Rothman, 90, British political activist.
John Symank, 66, American gridiron football player.
Juan Edmundo Vecchi, 70, Argentine Roman Catholic priest, Rector Major of the Salesians.
Phil Warren, 63, New Zealand music promoter and politician, chairman of Auckland Regional Council.

24
Stuart Burge, 84, British film director, producer and actor (Nottingham Playhouse, Royal Court Theatre).
Paul B. Carpenter, 73, American politician (California State Assembly, California State Senate), convicted of corruption.
Nunzio Filogamo, 99, Italian television and radio presenter, actor and singer.
Janet Friedman, American archaeologist.
Peter Gzowski, 67, Canadian broadcaster, writer and reporter, emphysema.
Elie Hobeika, 45, Lebanese militia commander and politician, murdered.
Irene Kotowicz, 82, American baseball player (All-American Girls Professional Baseball League).
Upendra Kumar, 60, Indian composer.
Kurt Schaffenberger, 81, American comic book artist (Captain Marvel, Superman, Superman's Girl Friend, Lois Lane).
Gregorio Walerstein, 88, Mexican film producer and screenwriter.

25
J. Clifford Baxter, 43, American executive (Enron Corporation), suicide.
Willard Estey, 82, Canadian justice of the Supreme Court of Canada.
Chris Perry, 73, Indian musician, composer, songwriter and film producer.
Winston Place, 87, English cricketer.

26
Francisco Cabañas, 90, Mexican Olympic flyweight boxer (silver medal winner in flyweight boxing at the 1932 Summer Olympics).
Dorothy Carrington, 91, British writer, one of the leading scholars on Corsican culture and history.
Rudolph B. Davila, 85, United States Army officer, World War II Medal of Honor recipient.
Loonis McGlohon, 80, American songwriter and jazz pianist, wrote hundreds of songs including two recorded by Frank Sinatra.
Kenneth Yasuda, 87, Japanese-American scholar and translator.
Ray Yochim, 79, American baseball player (St. Louis Cardinals).

27
Robert L. Chapman, 81, American professor, dictionary editor and thesaurus editor (Roget's Thesaurus).
John A. D. Cooper, 83, American physician and educator, first full-time physician president of the Association of American Medical Colleges.
John James, 87, British racing driver.
Edgar Manske, 89, American football player.
Abelardo Raidi, 87, Venezuelan sportswriter and radio broadcaster.
Reggie Sanders, 52, American baseball player (Detroit Tigers).
Alain Vanzo, 73, French opera singer and composer, stroke.

28
Andrew W. Cooper, 74, African-American activist and journalist, publisher and editor-in-chief of The City Sun, stroke.
Gustaaf Deloor, 88, Belgian road racing cyclist.
Andy Kulberg, 57, American musician, lymphoma.
Astrid Lindgren, 94, Swedish writer of fiction and screenplays, viral infection.
Billy O'Rourke, 41, English professional footballer, brain haemorrhage.
Rudolph Douglas Raiford, 80, American combat officer during World War II.
Jack Witikka, 85, Finnish film director and screenwriter.
Ayse Nur Zarakolu, 55, Turkish publisher and human rights activist.

29
Stephen Wayne Anderson, 48, American murderer, execution by lethal injection.
Suzanne Bloch, 94, Swiss-American musician, teacher and early music specialist.
Florian Côté, 72, Canadian politician (member of Parliament representing Nicolet—Yamaska, Quebec and Richelieu, Quebec).
Erik Dons, 86, Norwegian diplomat.
Richard Grenier, 68, American columnist and film critic, heart attack.
R. M. Hare, 82, English moral philosopher, series of strokes.
Heinz Hennig, 74, German choral conductor and an academic teacher.
Stratford Johns, 76, South African-born British actor (Z Cars, Softly, Softly, Cromwell), heart disease.
Night Train Lane, 74, American football player, heart attack.
James Marjoribanks, 90, British diplomat.
Phil McCall, 76, British actor.
Harold Russell, 88, Canadian-born American soldier (World War II) and actor (The Best Years of Our Lives), Oscar winner (1947), heart attack.

30
Martin Magner, 101,  German-American theatre-, radio-,and television director, cancer.
Inge Morath, 78, Austrian-born American photographer, cancer.
Jeanne Robert, 91, French historian and epigrapher.
Louis Salica, 89, American boxer (bronze medal in flyweight boxing at the 1932 Summer Olympics, 1935 and 1940 world bantamweight title).

31
Francis Acharya, 82, Belgian Roman Catholic monk.
Jim Camp, 77, American professional football player (Brooklyn Dodgers) and college football head coach (George Washington University from 1961 to 1966).
Harry Chiti, 69, American baseball player (Chicago Cubs, Kansas City Athletics, Detroit Tigers, New York Mets).
Gabby Gabreski, 83, Polish-American World War II and Korean War fighter pilot, heart attack.
Henry Kloss, 72, American audio engineer and entrepreneur.
Hua Ruizhuo, 28/29, Chinese serial killer, executed.
Evelyn Scott, 86, American film and television actress (The Untouchables, Bonanza, Bachelor Father, Peyton Place).

References 

2002-01
 01